Einstein's Unfinished Symphony: Listening to the Sounds of Space-Time is a 2000 non-fiction book by Marcia Bartusiak about the preliminary work preceding operational efforts to detect the gravitational waves predicted by Einstein's theory of general relativity. She tells the story of LIGO's two gravitational-wave observatories in Louisiana and Washington State, with some mention of other such observatories in Italy, Germany, Japan, and Australia, and the scientists and scientific considerations involved. Initial LIGO operations between 2002 and 2010 did not detect any gravitational waves. After technical enhancements, gravitational waves were first detected in 2016. After the detection, Bartusiak wrote an updated version entitled Einstein's Unfinished Symphony: The Story of a Gamble, Two Black Holes, and a New Age of Astronomy published in 2017 by Yale University Press.

Reception
For her 2000 book, Bartusiak won the 2001 American Institute of Physics Science Writing Award to a Journalist.

References

External links
 

2000 non-fiction books
Science books
Books about the history of physics
Astronomy books